The 1959–60 St. Francis Terriers men's basketball team represented St. Francis College during the 1959–60 NCAA men's basketball season. The team was coached by Daniel Lynch, who was in his twelfth year at the helm of the St. Francis Terriers. The team was a member of the Metropolitan New York Conference and played their home games at the II Corps Artillery Armory in Park Slope, Brooklyn.

The Terriers finished the season at 13–8 overall and 2–1 in conference play. The Terriers squad was led by Richie Dreyer, the leading scorer and rebounder.

Roster

Schedule and results

|-
!colspan=12 style="background:#0038A8; border: 2px solid #CE1126;;color:#FFFFFF;"| Regular Season

  

   

                 
|-

References

St. Francis Brooklyn Terriers men's basketball seasons
St. Francis
Saint Francis
Saint Francis